Lulikabad, also known as Lulik, may refer to:
 Lulikabad-e Bala
 Lulikabad-e Pain